Abbot Artemy (игумен Троицкого монастыря Артемий; Артемий Троицкий) was a Russian abbot condemned for heresy in the time of Ivan the Terrible along with Matvei Bashkin and, in absentia, Feodosij Kosoj. Artemy was abbot of Trinity Lavra of St. Sergius.

References

Russian Christian monks
Former Russian Orthodox Christians
Converts to Protestantism from Eastern Orthodoxy
Tsardom of Russia people